Jacques Doriot (26 September 1898 – 22 February 1945) was a French politician, initially communist, later fascist, before and during World War II.

In 1936, after his exclusion from the Communist Party, he founded the French Popular Party (PPF) and took over the newspaper La Liberté, which took a stand against the Popular Front.

During the war, Doriot was a radical supporter of collaboration and contributed to the creation of the Legion of French Volunteers against Bolshevism (LVF). He fought personally in German uniform on the Eastern Front, with the rank of lieutenant.

Early life and politics
Doriot moved to Saint Denis, near Paris, at an early age and became a labourer. In 1916, in the midst of World War I, he became a committed socialist, but his political activity was halted by his joining the French Army in 1917. Participating in active combat during World War I, Doriot was captured by enemy troops and remained a prisoner of war until 1918. For his wartime service, Doriot was awarded the Croix de guerre.

After being released, he returned to France and in 1920 joined the French Communist Party (PCF), quickly rising through the party - within a few years, he had become one of the PCF major leaders. In 1922 he became a member of the Presidium of the Executive Committee of the Comintern, and a year later was made Secretary of the French Federation of Young Communists. In 1923, Doriot was arrested for violently protesting French occupation of the Ruhr Area. He was released a year later, upon being elected to the French Chamber of Deputies (the Third Republic equivalent of the National Assembly) by the people of Saint Denis.

Fascism
In 1931, Doriot was elected mayor of Saint Denis. Around this time, he opposed the "social fascism" theory and came to advocate a Popular Front alliance between the Communists and other French socialist parties with whom Doriot sympathized on a number of issues. Although this would soon become official Communist Party policy, at the time it was seen as heretical and Doriot was expelled from the Communist Party in 1934. This expulsion provoked a great sadness in Doriot, but above all a great anger and a thirst for revenge against the PCF leadership.

Still a member of the Chamber of Deputies, Doriot struck back at the Communists who had renounced him: now bitter towards the Comintern, his views turned to embrace the French nation, evolving into a 'national' socialism—as opposed to the socialism of the Third International. By now embodying fascist more than socialist ideals, Doriot founded the ultra-nationalist Parti Populaire Français (PPF) in 1936. Doriot and his supporters were vocal advocates of France becoming organized along the lines of Fascist Italy and Nazi Germany and were bitter opponents of Socialist Premier Léon Blum and his Popular Front coalition.

Collaboration

When France went to war with Germany in 1939, Doriot became a staunch pro-German and supported Germany's occupation of northern France in 1940. Doriot resided in collaborationist Vichy France for a time, but he eventually found that it was not nearly as Fascist as he had hoped it would be and moved to occupied Paris, where he espoused pro-German and anti-communist propaganda on Radio Paris. In 1941, he and fellow fascist collaborator Marcel Déat founded the Légion des Volontaires Français (LVF), a French unit of the Wehrmacht.

Doriot fought with the LVF and saw active duty on the Eastern Front when Germany invaded the Soviet Union in June 1941 and was awarded the Iron Cross in 1943. In his absence leadership of the PPF officially passed to a directorate, although real power came to lie with Maurice-Yvan Sicard. In December 1944, Doriot travelled to Germany and made contact with the former members of the Vichy regime and other collaborators who had gathered together in the Sigmaringen enclave. Doriot's PPF struggled to assume a leadership role within the French expatriate community, basing itself in Mainau and setting up its own radio station, Radio-Patrie, at Bad Mergentheim and publishing its own paper Le Petit Parisien. The PPF was also involved in conducting intelligence and sabotage activities by supplying some volunteers whom the Germans dropped by parachute into liberated France. He was killed on 22 February 1945 while traveling from Mainau to Sigmaringen when his car was strafed by Allied fighter planes. He was buried in Mengen.

See also
 Nicola Bombacci

Notes

References
Alexander, Martin and Helen Graham (1989).  The French and Spanish Popular Fronts: Comparative Perspectives. Cambridge: Cambridge University Press.
Allardyce, Gilbert (1966). "The Political Transitions of Jacques Doriot." Journal of Contemporary History. 1 (1966).
Arnold, Edward (2000). The Development of the Radical Right in France: From Boulanger to le Pen. London: Macmillan.
(1945). "Jacques Doriot, French Pro-Nazi, is Killed by Allied Fliers, Germans Report." New York Times. February 24.
Soucy, Robert (1966). "The Nature of Fascism in France." Journal of Contemporary History. 1 (1966).

External links
  Time Magazine, May 11, 1942.
 

1898 births
1945 deaths
People from Oise
Politicians from Hauts-de-France
French Communist Party politicians
French Popular Party politicians
Members of the 13th Chamber of Deputies of the French Third Republic
Members of the 14th Chamber of Deputies of the French Third Republic
Members of the 15th Chamber of Deputies of the French Third Republic
Members of the 16th Chamber of Deputies of the French Third Republic
French male non-fiction writers
French Army soldiers
French military personnel of World War I
French prisoners of war in World War I
World War I prisoners of war held by Germany
Recipients of the Croix de Guerre 1914–1918 (France)
Recipients of the Iron Cross (1939)
Waffen-SS personnel killed in action
Deaths by airstrike during World War II
French anti-communists
Former Marxists
French fascists
Legion of French Volunteers Against Bolshevism personnel
20th-century French journalists
La Liberté (French newspaper) editors
SS-Sturmbannführer